Bruno Sebastián Romo Rojas (born 20 May 1989), known as Bruno Romo, is a Chilean footballer that currently plays as a defender for Deportes Copiapó. Before re-joining Colo-Colo, Romo played for Palestino and Santiago Wanderers, in where the player had a great performance at the first club mentioned.

He played for the Chilean national U20 national team in the 2009 South American Youth Championship held in Venezuela. Romo was named in Chile's preliminary 30-man squad for the 2011 Copa América on 27 May 2011, although he was eventually omitted from the final 23-man squad on 28 June.

Club career

Early career
Romo professionally debuted for Colo-Colo in November 2006, in where he made a good match in a 1–0 home win over Deportes Puerto Montt for the first leg of the playoffs quarterfinals. In that moment, the coach Fernando Astengo directed him because the coach Claudio Borghi prepared the first team for the Copa Sudamericana. In the first half of 2007, Romo integrated Colo-Colo B and in the second integrated the first team, in where won the 2007 Clausura Tournament, being this his second professional title after of the 2006 Clausura Tournament.

In March 2008, Borghi left the club and arrived Fernando Astengo, who directed him in the game that Colo-Colo won to Puerto Montt in the 2006 playoffs. His debut with Astengo was in a 1–0 home loss with Ñublense, now for the playoffs of 2008. His team was runner-up of the tournament losing 3–2 against Everton in the aggregate result. After of loss the final, the club loaned him to Santiago Wanderers.

In January 2009, he returned to Colo-Colo, being directed now by Marcelo Barticciotto in the Apertura Tournament. In that season, Romo won the Clausura Tournament, but with Hugo Tocalli due to Barticciotto was fired after a poor first semester.

Palestino
In January 2010, Romo joined Palestino on loan. His incorporation to that club was due to a barter of Luis Pavez for Gerardo Cortés, Rodolfo Moya and he. The player was one of the key players of the club along with Cortés, Nicolás Canales and Jaime Riveros. In the next season, for the Apertura Tournament under the coach Gustavo Benítez, Romo was named in the ideal team of the tournament and also was named in Chilean national football team's preliminary 30-man squad for the 2011 Copa América on 27 May 2011, although he was eventually omitted from the final 23-man squad on 28 June.

Despite of the irregularity of Palestino, Romo continued being an important player in the starting lineup of the team, so much was that Colo-Colo's directive confirmed him in the next season team that is coached by Ivo Basay, who directed him at the 2009 South American Youth Championship in Venezuela. During the season, Romo made 30 appearances and not scored goals, having a total of 47 matches played for the club between the 2010 and 2011 season, seventeen in his first season and thirty in his next season.

International career
He played for the Chilean national U20 national team in the 2009 South American Youth Championship held in Venezuela. Romo was named in Chile's preliminary 30-man squad for the 2011 Copa América on 27 May 2011, although he was eventually omitted from the final 23-man squad on 28 June.

On 2 September 2011, Romo made his international debut in a 3–1 win of Chile U25 over Mexico U22 at Alfonso Lastras Stadium, replacing to Carlos Muñoz at the 91st minute.  On 7 September, he played as a starter in the second game played against Mexico at Estadio La Granja in a 2–2 draw, being also red carded for second yellow card in the 101st minute.

Honours
Colo-Colo
 Primera División de Chile (3): 2006 Clausura, 2007 Clausura, 2009 Clausura

Notes

References

External links
 
 

1989 births
Living people
Footballers from Santiago
Chilean footballers
Chilean expatriate footballers
Chile under-20 international footballers
Chile international footballers
Colo-Colo footballers
Colo-Colo B footballers
Santiago Wanderers footballers
Club Deportivo Palestino footballers
Deportes Copiapó footballers
Rangers de Talca footballers
C.D. Antofagasta footballers
FC Juárez footballers
Chilean Primera División players
Segunda División Profesional de Chile players
Primera B de Chile players
Liga MX players
Expatriate footballers in Mexico
Chilean expatriate sportspeople in Mexico
Association football defenders